Smiths Corner is a community in Weldford Parish located on the Richibucto River,  southwest of Bass River, on Route 116 and Route 465 to Harcourt.

History

Smiths Corner had a Post Office 1893-1959. In 1898 Smiths Corner was a farming and lumbering settlement with a population of 100.

Notable people

See also
List of communities in New Brunswick

References
 

Settlements in New Brunswick
Communities in Kent County, New Brunswick